C96 may refer to:
 Mauser C96, a semiautomatic pistol
 Ruy Lopez chess openings ECO code
 Fee-Charging Employment Agencies Convention (Revised), 1949 code
 a class IIB wind turbine manufactured by Clipper Windpower